VEGF receptors are receptors for vascular endothelial growth factor (VEGF). There are three main subtypes of VEGFR, numbered 1, 2 and 3. Also, they may be membrane-bound (mbVEGFR) or soluble (sVEGFR), depending on alternative splicing.

Inhibitors of VEGFR are used in the treatment of cancer.

VEGF

Vascular endothelial growth factor (VEGF) is an important signaling protein involved in both vasculogenesis (the formation of the circulatory system) and angiogenesis (the growth of blood vessels from pre-existing vasculature). As its name implies, VEGF activity is restricted mainly to cells of the vascular endothelium, although it does have effects on a limited number of other cell types (e.g. stimulation monocyte/macrophage migration). In vitro, VEGF has been shown to stimulate endothelial cell mitogenesis and cell migration. VEGF also enhances microvascular permeability and is sometimes referred to as vascular permeability factor.

Receptor biology

All members of the VEGF family stimulate cellular responses by binding to tyrosine kinase receptors (the VEGFRs) on the cell surface, causing them to dimerize and become activated through transphosphorylation. The VEGF receptors have an extracellular portion consisting of 7 immunoglobulin-like domains, a single transmembrane spanning region and an intracellular portion containing a split tyrosine-kinase domain.

VEGF-A binds to VEGFR-1 (Flt-1) and VEGFR-2 (KDR/Flk-1). VEGFR-2 appears to mediate almost all of the known cellular responses to VEGF. The function of VEGFR-1 is less well defined, although it is thought to modulate VEGFR-2 signaling. Another function of VEGFR-1 is to act as a dummy/decoy receptor, sequestering VEGF from VEGFR-2 binding (this appears to be particularly important during vasculogenesis in the embryo). In fact, an alternatively spliced form of VEGFR-1 (sFlt1) is not a membrane bound protein but is secreted and  functions primarily as a decoy. A third receptor has been discovered (VEGFR-3), however, VEGF-A is not a ligand for this receptor. VEGFR-3 mediates lymphangiogenesis in response to VEGF-C and VEGF-D.

In addition to binding to VEGFRs, TACO VEGF binds to receptor complexes consisting of both neuropilins and VEGFRs. This receptor complex has increased VEGF signalling activity in endothelial cells (blood vessels).  Neuropilins (NRP) are pleiotropic receptors and therefore other molecules may interfere with the signalling of the NRP/VEGFR receptor complexes. For example, Class 3 semaphorins compete with VEGF165 for NRP binding and could therefore regulate VEGF-mediated angiogenesis.

References

External links 
 
  - the Vascular Endothelial Growth Factor Receptor Structure in Interactive 3D

Tyrosine kinase receptors
Proteins